Die Stadt hinter dem Strom (The city beyond the river) is a German language existentialist novel by Hermann Kasack, published in 1947 in Berlin. It is considered one of the most important novels written in Germany after World War II, dealing with the horrors of Nazi Germany, along with works such as Thomas Mann's Doctor Faustus and Günter Grass' The Tin Drum.

History
Hermann Kasack described a "Schreckensvision" (horror vision) initiating the writing of the novel: "'Ich sah die Flächen einer gespenstischen Ruinenstadt, die sich ins Unendliche verlor und in der sich die Menschen wie Scharen von gefangenen Puppen bewegten." (I saw a vast ruined city, extending endlessly, in which people moved about like imprisoned puppets). Kasack wrote the novel in two periods, first during the war from 1942 to 1944, then after the war in 1946. Kasack had not left Nazi Germany, but remained in what was later described as "Innere Emigration" (inner emigration). He shows the individual, helpless in an incomprehensible society, questioning existence.

A shortened version of the novel was published in the Berlin newspaper Der Tagesspiegel in 1946 before the complete novel was published in 1947. The novel was well received and soon translated to several languages. The first translation to English by Peter De Mendelssohn was published in 1953 by Longman in London and New York. A revised version of 1956 was published in 1960.

Kasack's fictional vision of a city shows similarities to Ernst Jünger's Heliopolis.

In 1949 Kasack was awarded the Fontane Prize of the city of Berlin for this work. He was the first recipient of this prize. Kasack himself used the novel as the base for an opera libretto. The work Die Stadt hinter dem Strom, termed an "Oratorische Oper" (Oratorio Opera), by Hans Vogt was premiered at the Hessisches Staatstheater Wiesbaden in 1955.

Plot
The protagonist is the orientalist Dr. Robert Lindhoff, introduced to the reader just as Robert. He travels by railroad on a mission which is unclear to him to a foreign city, which appears as strange and incomprehensible. He meets people whom he believes to be dead, such as his father and his beloved Anna.

Robert receives the order from an invisible authority of the city to write a "Chronik" (chronicle) of the city. Robert is called the Chronicler, and he explores the city, partly on his own, partly guided. The city is a megalopolis under a cloudless sky, full of catacombs, without music. Its people appear more and more strange and incomprehensible to him. The people resemble shadows and perform senseless, repetitive and destructive tasks. Two factories employ many of them, one producing building blocks from dust, one destroying building blocks to dust. Robert feels unable to write the chronicle. The authority who ordered it thanks him anyway for his work full of insight.

Back in his home country, Robert travels restlessly, lecturing on the sense of life. In the end he travels to the city, as in the beginning.

Editions in German
 Berlin 1946, shortened version in Der Tagesspiegel
 Berlin 1947
 Frankfurt am Main 1960, Suhrkamp, revised version of 1956 
 München/Zürich 1964, Knaur paperback
 Frankfurt am Main 1983, Suhrkamp, Weiße Reihe
 Frankfurt am Main 1988, Suhrkamp, volume 296 of Bibliothek Suhrkamp
 Leipzig 1989

Translations
 Staden bortom floden, Stockholm 1950
 La ville au delà du fleuve, Paris 1951
 La città oltre il fiume, Milano 1952
 Kaupunki virran takana, Helsinki 1952
 The city beyond the river, London, New York, Toronto 1953
 Byen og elven, Oslo 1954
 La ciudad detras del rio, Buenos Aires
 Город за рекой, Moscow 1992
 奔流之后的城市   Chinese translation of the book
강물 뒤의 도시 Seoul 1984
流れの背後の市   japanese translation of the book,1954

Literature
 Hermann Kasack: Die Stadt hinter dem Strom. Eine Selbstkritik, Die Welt, No. 142, 29 November 1947, p. 2 
 Wolfgang Kasack: Hermann Kasack. "Die Stadt hinter dem Strom" in der Kritik. Eine Bibliographie der wichtigsten Aufsätze und Besprechungen., Württembergische Landesbibliothek Stuttgart, 1952 
 Lothar Fietz: Strukturelemente der hermetischen Romane Thomas Manns, Hermann Hesses, Hermann Brochs und Hermann Kasacks, Deutsche Vierteljahresschrift für Literaturwissenschaft und Geistesgeschichte 40, 1966, p. 161-183 
 Ehrhard Bahr: Metaphysische Zeitdiagnose: Hermann Kasack, Elisabeth Langgässer und Thomas Mann, in: Gegenwartsliteratur und Drittes Reich, H. Wagner, Stuttgart 1977, p. 133-162 
 Gene O. Stimpson: Zwischen Mystik und Naturwissenschaften. Hermann Kasacks "Die Stadt hinter dem Strom" im Lichte des neuen Paradigmas, Europäische Hochschulschriften, Reihe 1 - 1503, Frankfurt am Main 1995 
 Mathias Bertram: Literarische Epochendiagnosen der Nachkriegszeit, in: Deutsche Erinnerung. Berliner Beiträge zur Prosa der Nachkriegsjahre (1945-1960), Ursula Heukenkamp, Berlin 2000, p. 11-100 
 Hermann Kasack: Die Stadt hinter dem Strom. Essay in German: www.Signaturen-Magazin.de

References

External links
 Bibliographie: Die Stadt hinter dem Strom University of Potsdam

1947 German novels
Novels adapted into operas
Existentialist novels